Greene E. Evans (September 19, 1848 – October 1, 1914)  was a porter, groundskeeper, laborer, deputy wharf-master, city councilman, census enumerator,  mail agent, teacher, and state legislator in Tennessee. He was enslaved early in his life.

He studied at Fisk University in Nashville and lived in Memphis. A Republican, he served in the Tennessee General Assembly from 1885 to 1887. 
 He attended the 1885 World’s Industrial and Cotton Centennial Exposition in New Orleans as a representative of the General Assembly and was an honored guest.

He was a singer and belonged to a lyceum. He eventually settled in Chicago with his wife and only child, working as a coal dealer.

He lived in Memphis in Shelby County, Tennessee.

See also
African-American officeholders during and following the Reconstruction era
African Americans in Tennessee

References

19th-century American slaves
Republican Party members of the Tennessee House of Representatives
1848 births
1914 deaths
Fisk University alumni
Politicians from Memphis, Tennessee
African-American politicians during the Reconstruction Era
Schoolteachers from Tennessee
19th-century American politicians
African-American educators
African-American state legislators in Tennessee
19th-century American educators
Tennessee city council members
20th-century African-American people